Mazen is a given name. Notable people with the name include:

Ahlam Mazen At-Tamimi, Palestinian woman known for assistance in carrying out the Sbarro restaurant suicide bombing
Mazen Dana (1962–2003), Palestinian journalist who worked as a Reuters cameraman
Mazen Darwish, Syrian lawyer and free speech advocate
Mazen Gamal (born 1986), Egyptian squash player
Mazen Hesham, (born 1994), professional squash player who represents Egypt
Abu Mazen (born 1935), President of the State of Palestine and Palestinian National Authority
Mazen al-Tumeizi (1978–2004), Palestinian journalist, killed on-camera in Baghdad, Iraq by U.S. helicopter gunfire
Mazen Metwaly (born 1990), Saudi Arabian-born Egyptian professional swimmer, specialising in Open water swimming
Mazen Mneimneh (born 1986), Lebanese basketball player
Mazen Sinokrot, Palestinian politician
Mazen Shehata (born 1998), Egyptian marine engineer

See also
Matzen (disambiguation)
Mazenod (disambiguation)